Nanothinophilus is a genus of flies in the family Dolichopodidae.

Species
Nanothinophilus armatus Grootaert & Meuffels, 1998
Nanothinophilus dolichurus Grootaert & Meuffels, 1998
Nanothinophilus hoplites Grootaert & Meuffels, 2001
Nanothinophilus pauperculus Grootaert & Meuffels, 1998

References

Hydrophorinae
Dolichopodidae genera
Insects of Thailand
Diptera of Asia